Section 21 of the New York State Social Services Law requires the New York State Department of Social Services to design and implement a Welfare Management System (WMS) capable of receiving, maintaining and processing information relating to persons who apply for benefits, or who are determined to be eligible for benefits under any program administered by the Department."
Among its purposes are "promoting efficiency in local district determinations of eligibility for public assistance and care", "to expedite such determinations", and "to reduce unauthorized or excessive payments".

See also 
Office of Temporary and Disability Assistance

References

External links 
Office of Temporary and Disability Assistance Welfare Management System: General and Application Controls
Related reports
New York Consolidated Laws, Social Services Law - SOS § 21. Welfare management system

Welfare in New York (state)
New York (state) law